Hilara maura is a species of dance fly, in the fly family Empididae.

References

Empididae
Diptera of Europe
Insects described in 1776
Taxa named by Johan Christian Fabricius